Justin Putuhena (born 12 May 1986), better known by his stage name Justin Prime, is a Dutch progressive and electro house DJ and record producer. He is a sound engineer graduate and began his music career in 2001 producing techno and hardstyle music.

He released Cannonball with Showtek in 2012 and received a platinum-plated record plus two golden records for this track.

He collaborated with Tiësto, Showtek, Dimitri Vegas & Like Mike and Steve Aoki to name a few, he also remixed Jennifer Lopez, Rihanna, David Guetta, Flo Rida, Rita Ora, Iggy Azalea and worked with U2 singer Bono.

Discography

Charting singles

As lead artist

Other releases 
2011
 Justin Prime - Secrets

2012
 Justin Prime - Freedom
 Justin Prime - Brisk
 Justin Prime - Feel It
 Justin Prime - Revolt / R!se
 Showtek and Justin Prime - Cannonball (Spinnin' Records/Musical Freedom)

2013
 Justin Prime - Bring The Bass (Spinnin' Records)
 Justin Prime - Chaser
 Justin Prime and Joey Dale - Poing! (Dim Mak Records)
 Showtek and Justin Prime featuring Matthew Koma - Cannonball (Earthquake) (Spinnin' Records/Musical Freedom)

2014
 Justin Prime and Sidney Samson – Thunderbolt (Spinnin' Records)
 Justin Prime - Fairchild (Dim Mak Records)
 Justin Prime - Striker (Dim Mak Records)

2015
 Justin Prime and Neple - Crank It Up!
 Blasterjaxx and Justin Prime - Push Play

2016
 Justin Prime - Insane (SKINK)
 Justin Prime and We Are Loud - Drowning (Armada Music)

2017
 We Are Loud and Justin Prime featuring Grey MTTR - Tomorrow Sounds (Armada Music)
 Justin Prime and Liam Turner - SEOUL
 Justin Prime featuring Cristi Vaughan - Wasteland (Armada Music)
 Justin Prime featuring CUT_ - Light It Up (Armada Music)
 Justin Prime and Onderkoffer featuring Taylor Jones - Lights Off (Spinnin' Records/Trap City)
 Justin Prime featuring Belle Doron - Mirror On The Wall (Armada Trice)

2018
 Justin Prime and NIVIRO featuring Kimberly Fransens - Unstoppable (Armada Trice)
 Justin Prime - Forever (Armada Trice)
 Justin Prime - In Your Face (Revealed Recordings)
 Justin Prime and Steven Vegas - SMASH (Revealed Recordings)

2019
 Justin Prime x D3FAI featuring Jake Lewis - Earthquake (TurnItUp Music)
 Justin Prime, Dyson and Taylor Jones - Can't Stop It (One Seven Music)
 Justin Prime and Reggio - Dominate (Revealed Recordings)
 Justin Prime x Rave Republic featuring Lee McKing - Old School (TurnItUp Music)
 Da Candy x Justin Prime x Onderkoffer featuring Jackie's Boy and Lil Eddie - Fever (Armada Music)
 SICK INDIVIDUALS and Justin Prime featuring Bymia - Not Alone (Revealed Recordings)
 Devarsity x Onderkoffer x Justin Prime - KLAP  (KLAP)
 NIVIRO and Justin Prime - Reloaded (Revealed Recordings)
 Justin Prime x Subliminals - Boom! (TurnItUp Muzik)
 Justin Prime and We Are Loud - Holding On (OneSeven)
 Justin Prime and Vito Mendez featuring Sensei Milla - Tear Dem Down (Smash The House)
 Justin Prime and Alejandro Reyes - Ladron (The Hana Road Music Group)
 SICK INDIVIDUALS and Justin Prime featuring Nevve - Guilty (Revealed Recordings)

2020
 Justin Prime and VIVID - Don't Stop (Zero Cool)
 Justin Prime and Reggio - Speaker Test (TurnItUp Muzik)
 3 Are Legend x Justin Prime x Sandro Silva - Raver Dome (Smash The House/Ultra Records)
 Rave Republic and Justin Prime - Lionheart (TurnItUp Muzik)
 SICK INDIVIDUALS and Justin Prime featuring Lasada - Ocean (Revealed Recordings)
 Justin Prime and Subliminals - Buena Vida (TurnItUp Muzik)

2021
 Futuristic Polar Bears and Justin Prime - United We Stand (Cmmd Records)
 Justin Prime and Husman - Ninja (Rave Culture)
 Justin Prime and Vito Mendez - Rebirth of Sound (Maxximize Records)
 Justin Prime and SaberZ - Neutron (Rave Culture)
 Justin Prime and Onderkoffer - WTF? (Revealed Music)
 Justin Prime and Stvw - Knockout (Warner Music
 W&W, Sandro Silva and Justin Prime - This Is Our Legacy (Rave Culture)
 Justin Prime, Renato S and Drek's featuring Heleen - City of Starlight (NexChapter)

Remixes 
 Malea - One Hot Mess (Justin Prime Remix)
 Moto featuring Jean Michel - Crying (Justin Prime Remix)
 Justin Caruso and Aude featuring Christina Novelli - Satellite (Justin Prime Remix)
 Asher Monroe - Hush Hush (Justin Prime Remix)
 Swedish House Mafia - Save The World (Justin Prime Remix)
 Iggy Azalea featuring Rita Ora - Black Widow (Justin Prime Remix)
 Rihanna and David Guetta – Right Now (Justin Prime Remix)
 Flo Rida featuring Jennifer Lopez – Sweet Spot (Justin Prime Remix)
 Rave Radio and Chris Willis – Feel The Love (Justin Prime Remix)
 Sandro Silva featuring Jack Miz – Let Go Tonight (Justin Prime Remix)

Co-productions 
 Tiësto - Footprints (from the album A Town Called Paradise) (2014)
 U2 vs. Tiësto - Pride (In The Name Of Love) (from the album Dance (RED) Save Lives) (2013)
 Passion Pit - Carried Away (Tiësto Remix) (2013)
 Nelly Furtado - Parking Lot (Tiësto Remix) (2012)
 Youngblood Hawke - We Come Running (Tiësto Remix) (2012)

Websites 
 Official website

References

Dutch dance musicians
Dutch record producers
Dutch DJs
1986 births
Living people
Revealed Recordings artists
Dutch people of Ukrainian-Jewish descent
Electronic dance music DJs